Stonewall Jackson Elementary School may refer to several schools in the United States:

 Stonewall Jackson Elementary School, Bristol, Virginia; see Bristol Virginia Public Schools
 Stonewall Jackson Elementary School, Plant City, Florida; see Hillsborough County Public Schools
 Mockingbird Elementary School (Dallas), Texas, formerly named Stonewall Jackson Elementary School

See also
 Stonewall Jackson School (disambiguation)